The Rensselaer Engineers represented Rensselaer Polytechnic Institute in ECAC women's ice hockey during the 2014–15 NCAA Division I women's ice hockey season. The Engineers did not qualify for the ECAC tournament.

Offseason

August 23:Heidi Huhtamaki was invited to participate in Team Finland Camp to qualify for Team Finland in the 2015 World Championships.

Recruiting

2014–15 Engineers

Schedule

|-
!colspan=12 style="background:#F7001F;color:white;"| Regular Season

References

Rensselaer
RPI Engineers women's ice hockey seasons
RPI 
RPI